Jamal Hamdan (born 20 February 1958) is a Lebanese actor and voice actor.

Filmography

Film 
Warshots. 1996

Television 
Bab Almorad - Ali ibn Ja'far al-Sadiq. 2014
Qiyamat Al Banadiq. 2013
Al Ghaliboun. 2011
Ajyal. 2010
Im Visier der Zielfahnder - Araber #2. 2002

Plays

Dubbing roles 
 1001 Inventions and the Library of Secrets - Al-Jazari / Librarian
 Atlantis: The Lost Empire - Fenton Q. Harcourt (Classical Arabic version)
 Atlantis: Milo's Return - Erik Hellstrom (Classical Arabic version)
 Doctor Who
 The Men of Angelos
 Mokhtarnameh - Umar ibn Sa'ad
 The Mysterious Cities of Gold
 Robin Hood - Prince John (Classical Arabic version)
 The Wild Soccer Bunch

References

External links 
 

1958 births
Lebanese male actors
Lebanese male voice actors
Living people